Jalan H.R. Rasuna Said or Jalan Rasuna Said is one of the main avenues of Jakarta, Indonesia. It was constructed during the 1970s. It is located in the Golden Triangle of Jakarta. The road was named after Hajjah Rangkayo Rasuna Said, a National Hero of Indonesia. The road runs  from Setiabudi, South Jakarta, to Tendean, Mampang Prapatan, South Jakarta. The Rasuna Said Street is also one of the Odd–even Traffic Restriction Scheme implementation zones (Monday to Friday, 06:00-10:00 and 16:00-21:00).

History and planning 

Jalan Rasuna Said was a relatively new thoroughfare in Jakarta, having been planned during the early 1970s, when the Indonesian economy began a period of sustained high economic growth as a result of oil export revenue during the 1973 global energy crisis. Construction commenced in 1973, launched by Public Works and Electricity Minister Sutami. Planners had originally intended to extend Jalan HOS Cokroaminoto in Menteng to the south to meet Jalan Gatot Subroto. In this plan, the south end of Jalan Rasuna Said would be connected to Jalan Gatot Subroto via a partial cloverleaf interchange. This cloverleaf interchange plan was not implemented.

Jalan Rasuna Said was completed by 1979. Its first buildings included Gelanggang Soemantri Brojonegoro Sports Complex (1974), Gedung Wanita (demolished, now Gama Tower), and Setiabudi Building complex.

The area southwest of Jalan Kuningan was planned as the Future Kuningan Kompleks to contain a complex of embassies. This complex was developed as Mega Kuningan, one of the most expensive areas in Jakarta and home to the embassies of Hungary, Switzerland, the Netherlands, India, Singapore and Poland.

In the 1990s, Jalan Professor Dr. Satrio and Jalan Casablanca would extend from Jalan Kyai Haji Mas Mansyur through to Tebet, passing Jalan Rasuna Said in the middle via an underpass. In the 2010s, a flyover was constructed to ease congestion.

Administrative villages
The road crosses seven administrative villages of Jakarta:
 Menteng, Central Jakarta
 Setiabudi, South Jakarta
 Guntur
Karet
 Karet Kuningan 
 Kuningan Timur
 Kuningan Barat, South Jakarta

There is an access point towards Mega Kuningan from the road. This road houses many important buildings, such as the Corruption Eradication Commission, Ministry of Health and foreign embassies.

Notable buildings along Jl. HR. Rasuna Said 

Buildings are sorted from Menteng to Mampang Prapatan.

Intersections 

This road has 10 intersections, namely:
 Intersection Rasuna Said Bridge (towards Sudirman Station and Latuharhari)
 Intersection St. Regis Hotel Jakarta (towards St. Regis Hotel Jakarta)
 Intersection of East Menara Imperium (towards Tower Empire and Epicentrum)
 Intersection of West Atrium Setiabudi / Setiabudi Aini (towards Aini Hospital)
 Intersection of West and East (towards Karet Pedurenan and Epicentrum)
 Intersection of East GOR Sumantri (towards Epicentrum)
 Intersection of West and East Casablanca (into Kuningan and Casablanca)
 Intersection of West and East Patra Kuningan (into Mega Kuningan and Patra Park)
 Crossroads Kuningan Mampang (towards Semanggi and Pancoran)
 Intersection Tendean (towards Tendean Plaza and Trans TV)

Transportation

Bus routes

Transjakarta 

The road is served by TransJakarta Corridor 6 with the route from Ragunan to Dukuh Atas 2. There are five Transjakarta shelters, they are:
 Kuningan Timur
 Patra Kuningan
 Departemen Kesehatan (emergency shelter)
 GOR Soemantri (emergency shelter)
 Karet Kuningan
 Setiabudi Utara (emergency shelter)

Transjakarta routes that serves HR Rasuna Said Street are:

 Corridor  Pulo Gadung–Patra Kuningan
 Corridor 4H Pulo Gadung–Ragunan
 Corridor  Ragunan–Dukuh Atas 2
 Corridor  Ragunan–Monas via Kuningan
 Corridor 9K Kampung Rambutan–Halimun
 Corridor 13E Halimun–Puri Beta 1
 Corridor 6C Tebet Station - Patra Kuningan - Karet
 Corridor  6E Tebet Station- Mega Kuningan - Karet
 Corridor 6F Manggarai Station–Ragunan
 Corridor 6H Lebak Bulus - Senen
 Corridor 6M Manggarai Station–Blok M
 Royaltrans 6P Cibubur Junction - Kuningan
 Royaltrans B13 Summarecon Bekasi - Kuningan
 Royaltrans D31 South City Cinere - Kuningan

Other buses 
 Kopaja P20 Senen-Lebak Bulus
 Kopaja S66 Blok M-Manggarai
 Kopaja S602 Tanah Abang-Ragunan
 Kopaja S620 Blok M-Pasar Rumput

Train Lines 

The street is also served by the Cibubur  and the Bekasi Line  of the Greater Jakarta LRT with three stations. Those stations are

 Kuningan Station
 Rasuna Said Station
 Setiabudi Station

See also 

 Rasuna Said
 Mega Kuningan
 Golden Triangle of Jakarta

References

Cited works 
 Berkmoes, R.V. et al. ¨Indonesia¨. Lonely Planet, 2010.

Roads of Jakarta
Central Jakarta
South Jakarta